Lionel Nicholas Richard Wigram (born 22 December 1962) is a British film producer and screenwriter. He is the grandson of the war hero Lionel Wigram.

Education 
Wigram was educated at Eton College and the University of Oxford, where he was a co-founder of the Oxford Film Foundation.

Career 
Wigram started working as a runner for producer Elliott Kastner. After his job for Kastner for several years, he eventually produced several low budget films for him in partnership with Cassian Elwes. He then spent ten years working in the independent world both as an executive and as a producer. He ran Geena Davis and Renny Harlin's company, The Forge, and worked at Shep Gordon and Carolyn Pfeiffer's company, Alive Films.

Wigram was named a senior vice president of production at Warner Bros. in November 2000. As a studio executive, he was responsible for buying the Harry Potter book series for the studio, as well as overseeing the eight-film series. In addition, Wigram also championed such films as Three Kings, Charlotte Gray and The Big Tease. He later transitioned from executive to independent producer with a first look deal at Warner Bros. During his tenure, Wigram produced the 2009 hit film Sherlock Holmes. Wigram also co-wrote the story for the film. He was also a producer on the sequel, Sherlock Holmes: A Game of Shadows.  Wigram was also executive producer of the last four Harry Potter films, as well as August Rush and Legend of the Guardians: The Owls of Ga'Hoole.

In 2012, Wigram started a joint production company with his frequent collaborator, Guy Ritchie, called Ritchie/Wigram Productions. The company's first film, The Man from U.N.C.L.E., was released in August 2015.

Filmography

Personal
Wigram is married with two daughters.

References

1962 births
Living people
British film producers
People educated at Eton College
Alumni of the University of Oxford